Dipsadinae is a large subfamily of colubroid snakes, sometimes referred to as a family (Dipsadidae). They are found in most of the Americas, including the West Indies, and are most diverse in South America. There are more than 700 species.

Some are arboreal, but others are aquatic or terrestrial and may even burrow. Most are oviparous. Many eat frogs or lizards, and some consume mammals and birds. Several genera (e.g. Adelphicos, Atractus, Geophis, Dipsas, Ninia, Sibon, Sibynomorphus, Tropidodipsas) are specialized feeders on gooey and slimy prey, such as frog eggs, earthworms, snails, and slugs. Almost all species are completely harmless to humans, although a few genera (e.g. Borikenophis, Cubophis, Heterodon, Hydrodynastes, Philodryas) have inflicted painful bites with local, non-life-threatening symptoms.

Synonymy
Some authors refer to part or all of this group as Xenodontinae, but if the two names are used synonymously, Dipsadinae is the correct name because it is older. When Xenodontinae is used non-synonymously, it normally refers to the larger and more derived South American-Caribbean subclade containing the genus Xenodon and its relatives, whereas Dipsadinae sensu stricto is restricted to the smaller and more basal Central American subclade containing the genus Dipsas and its relatives. Also, a third North American group (sometimes called "Carphophiinae") contains nine species in five genera at the base of the Dipsadinae (the "North American relicts" thought to have descended from the ancestors of dipsadines as they crossed from Asia to South America by way of North America; genera Heterodon, Farancia, Diadophis, Carphophis, and Contia).

Genera 

Within the Dipsadinae, the three major groups/clades or subfamilies are the Central American group ("Dipsadinae" sensu stricto), the South American + Caribbean group ("Xenodontinae"), and a small North American group (sometimes called the "Carphophiinae" or, incorrectly, "Heterodontinae"). In addition, a number of snake genera are likely to be dipsadines based on their morphology and geographic range, but because of the absence of genetic data and information about their closest relatives, they are considered genera incertae sedis and are not currently placed in a subgroup of the Dipsadinae.

Central American clade ("Dipsadinae" sensu stricto)

South American + Caribbean clade ("Xenodontinae")

North American clade ("Carphophiinae")

Genera incertae sedis

Notes

References 

Dipsadinae
Reptile families
Taxa named by Charles Lucien Bonaparte